The 1972 France rugby union tour of Australia was a series of nine matches played by the France national rugby union team in Australia in May and June 1972. The French team went through the tour unbeaten by winning eight of its nine matches and drawing the other. France won the two-match test series against Australia (the Wallabies) 1–0 with the other match drawn. As of 2018 this remains France's only series victory on Australian soil.

Results
Scores and results list France's points tally first.

Touring party
 Manager: Réné Dasse
 Assistant Managers: Fernand Cazenave & Michel Celaya
 Captain: Walter Spanghero

Backs
 Pierre Villepreux
 H Cabrol
 B Duprat
 J Cantoni
 G Lavagne
 J Trillo
 C Dourthe
 J-P Lux
 Jo Maso
 J-L Berot
 A Marot
 M Barrau
 Jacques Fouroux

Forwards
 Jean-Claude Skrela
 P Biemouret
 O Saisset
 Walter Spanghero
 B Vinsonneau
 Jean-Pierre Bastiat
 Alain Estève
 J Iracabal
 J-L Azarèl
 Armand Vaquerin
 J-C Rossignol
 A Lubrano
 R Bénésis

Rugby union tours of Australia
France national rugby union team tours
History of rugby union matches between Australia and France
France rugby union tour of Australia
France rugby union tour of Australia
France rugby union tour of Australia